Samuel Loxton (born 1857 in Bristol; died 5 February 1922) was an English illustrator and artist who worked primarily in Bristol and the west of England. Some 2000 of his works are catalogued in the Bristol Central Library.

References

1857 births
1922 deaths
English illustrators
Artists from Bristol
19th-century British artists
20th-century British artists
19th-century English people
20th-century English people